A silver certificate is a certificate of ownership that silver owners hold instead of storing the actual silver. Several countries have issued silver certificates, including Cuba, the Netherlands, and the United States. Silver certificates have also been privately issued by various mints and bullion companies. One example was the Liberty Dollar issued by NORFED from 1998 to 2009.

Cuba

Cuban silver certificates were issued between 1934 and 1949 (and circulated from 1935 to the early 1950s). Prior and subsequent issues of Cuban banknotes were engraved and printed by private bank note companies in the United States, but the series from 1934 to 1949 were designed, engraved, and printed by the US at the Bureau of Engraving and Printing (BEP).

The first Cuban banknotes were issued in 1857 for El Banco Español De La Habana. Beginning in the late 1860s, Cuba contracted the National Bank Note Company (NBNC) for two issues of banknotes in 1869 and 1872. After absorbing NBNC, the American Bank Note Company (ABNC) engraved and printed Cuban banknotes for issues in 1889, 1896, 1897, 1905 for the National Bank of Cuba, 1944, and a 1949–50 issue for the Banco Nacional De Cuba (printed until 1960). Between 1905 and the introduction of BEP issued Cuban silver certificates in 1934, no banknotes were produced.

Netherlands

In 1914, because of silver shortage for minting, the Dutch government introduced silver certificates (zilverbonnen) for 1, 2½ and 5 guilder. Although the 5 guilder were only issued that year, the 1 guilder notes continued until 1920 and the 2½ guilder until 1927. In 1926, the Netherlands Bank introduced 20 guilder notes, followed by 50 guilder in 1929 and 500 guilder in 1930. These introductions followed the cessation of production of the unusual 40, 60 and 300 guilder notes during the 1920s. In 1938, silver notes were reintroduced for 1 and 2½ guilders.

United States

Silver certificates were issued between 1878 and 1964 in the United States as part of its circulation of paper currency.  They were produced in response to silver agitation by citizens who were angered by the Fourth Coinage Act, which had effectively placed the United States on a gold standard.  The certificates were initially redeemable for their face value of silver dollar coins and later (for one year – 24 June 1967 to 24 June 1968) in raw silver bullion.  Since 1968 they have been redeemable only in Federal Reserve Notes and are thus obsolete, but still valid legal tender at their face value.

Large-size silver certificates (1878 to 1923) were issued initially in denominations from $10 to $1,000 (in 1878 and 1880) and in 1886 the $1, $2, and $5 were authorized. In 1928, all United States bank notes were re-designed and the size reduced.  The small-size silver certificate (1928–1964) was only issued in denominations of $1, $5, and $10.

See also
 Silver standard

References

Notes

Bibliography

Metallism
Silver